David William Cowens (born October 25, 1948) is an American former professional basketball player and NBA head coach. At , he played the center position and occasionally played power forward. Cowens spent most of his playing career with the Boston Celtics. He was the 1971 NBA Rookie of the Year and the 1973 NBA Most Valuable Player. Cowens won NBA championships as a member of the Celtics in 1974 and 1976. He was inducted into the Naismith Memorial Basketball Hall of Fame in 1991. Cowens has also held coaching positions in the NBA, CBA, and WNBA.

College career 
After starring in high school at Newport Catholic High in his hometown of Newport, Kentucky, Cowens played his collegiate basketball at Florida State University from 1967 to 1970 for coach Hugh Durham. He scored 1,479 points in 78 games at Florida State, at 19.0 points per game, and ranks among Florida State's top 10 all-time scoring leaders.

Cowens is the all-time Florida State leading rebounder with 1,340 rebounds (17.2 rebounds per game). He holds the team record for best seasonal rebound average (17.5 in the 1968–1969 season). He once grabbed 31 rebounds (second-best all-time) against LSU in the 1968–69 season.

Cowens was named to theThe Sporting News All-America second team in 1970.  His number hangs in the rafters of the Donald L. Tucker Center.

NBA career

Rookie year
Cowens was selected as the fourth overall pick by the Boston Celtics in the 1970 NBA draft. Former Celtics center Bill Russell's recommendation of Cowens influenced the selection. While some critics believed that Cowens was too small to play center, Russell said: "No one is going to tell that kid he can't play center".

During his rookie year, Cowens averaged 17.0 points per game and 15.0 rebounds per game. He was named to the NBA All-Rookie First Team and shared the NBA's Rookie of the Year honors with Portland's Geoff Petrie.  He also led the league in personal fouls that same year.

Prime years and NBA championships 

In the 1972–73 season, Cowens averaged 20.5 ppg, 16.2 rpg and 4.1 apg while helping the Celtics to a league-best 68–14 record.  In that season also, Cowens scored 20 points, grabbed a career-high 32 rebounds and dished out 9 assists in a home win over the Houston Rockets. He carried the Celtics to the semifinals, where they met the New York Knicks. They won Game 1 of that best-of-7 series after Cowens recorded 15 points and 18 rebounds. However, they bowed out to the Knicks in Game 7. Cowens was chosen the NBA MVP as well as MVP of the All-Star Game that same season. Cowens and fellow Celtic Bill Russell both have the distinction of being named MVP of the league but not being included on the All-NBA First Team.

The following season, Cowens averaged 19.0 PPG, 15.7 RPG, 4.4 APG and 1.3 BPG while guiding the Celtics to a record of 56–26. Cowens was instrumental in bringing the Celtics into the playoffs, where they defeated the Buffalo Braves in six games and the New York Knicks in five. In the finals, the Celtics faced the top-seeded Milwaukee Bucks. The teams split the first six games, with each team winning at least once on their home court. This led to a decisive Game 7, where the Celtics faced the Bucks in Milwaukee. The Celtics prevailed thanks to a strong performance by Cowens, who recorded 28 points and 14 rebounds as the Celtics took their 12th NBA championship.

Cowens won his second NBA championship ring as a member of the 1975–1976 Celtics team that defeated the Phoenix Suns, 4–2, in the NBA Finals.

Leave of absence from the Celtics 

Eight games into the 1976–77 season on November 10, 1976, and with the Celtics on a four-game losing streak, Cowens left the team for "undisclosed reasons".  Speculations included that Cowens was upset that the team didn't offer Paul Silas a new contract after the previous season and traded him to the Denver Nuggets.  Other speculations were that he was unhappy with coach Tom Heinsohn and also his involvement in a lawsuit from the previous season where he allegedly struck a fan during a game against the Houston Rockets.  Cowens returned to the team in January 1977 and led them to the playoffs, where they lost in the second round to the Philadelphia 76ers.

Cowens averaged 18.6 points and 14 rebounds a game in the 1977–78 season, but the Celtics missed the playoffs for the first time since his 1970–71 rookie season.

After Coach Satch Sanders was fired following a 2–12 start to the 1978–1979 season, Cowens served as player-coach for the remainder of the season. The team finished the year with a 29–53 record.

Late career 
In his final season with the Celtics (1979–80), Cowens helped the team to a 61–21 record. Cowens averaged 14.2 points, 8.1 rebounds and 3.1 assists during the season. Cowens and the Celtics defeated the Houston Rockets 4–0 in the Eastern Conference playoffs before losing to the Philadelphia 76ers 4–1 in the Eastern Conference finals.

Cowens retired as a player in 1980, as Boston drafted Kevin McHale and traded for Robert Parish to replace him at center. Boston then won the 1981 NBA Championship. "I have sprained my ankle at least 30 times over the duration of my career, broken both legs and fractured a foot," Cowens said upon retiring. "Two years ago, a team of foot and bone specialists said they were amazed that I could play up to that point without sustaining serious injuries."

In 1982–83, Cowens felt the desire to play again and approached the Celtics about trading him, as they still held his rights. Cowens said, "The Celtics are set up front (with Bird, McHale and Parish). They could trade me, work something out. No disrespect to Bill Fitch. I'd advise any younger players to play for him, but I'd probably be better off somewhere else". After first negotiating with the Phoenix Suns, the Celtics traded Cowens to the Milwaukee Bucks, who were coached by former Celtic teammate Don Nelson. The Celtics received Quinn Buckner from Milwaukee as compensation. Cowens averaged 8.1 points, 6.9 rebounds and 2.1 assists in 25 minutes per game with the Bucks. He was injured in the final game of the regular season and was unable to play in the playoffs for Milwaukee. Cowens retired for good after the season.

Player profile and legacy
During his NBA career, Cowens averaged a double-double of 17.6 points and 13.6 rebounds. with 3.8 assists and 1.1 steals in 766 career NBA games. Cowens was selected to eight All-Star Games, was named to the All-NBA Second Team three times, and was named to the All-NBA Defensive First Team in 1976 and All-NBA Defensive Second Team in 1973 and 1980. He was a member of the Celtics' 1974 and 1976 NBA Championship teams.

Cowens' playing credo was all-out intensity at both ends of the court, a style that never wavered during his 11-year NBA career.  "He was quick, fast, strong and skilled, and played hard," Knicks Hall of Fame center Willis Reed said of Cowens.

Cowens was the fourth center in NBA history to average five assists per game in a single season, joining Wilt Chamberlain, former Celtic center, Bill Russell, and Kareem Abdul-Jabbar. His career average is 3.8 assists per game. As of the end of the 2018–19 season, Cowens ranked 27th overall for most point-rebound-assist triple-doubles by a center in NBA history.

As evidence to his all-around ability, only five other players (Scottie Pippen, Kevin Garnett, LeBron James, Giannis Antetokounmpo and Nikola Jokić) have led their teams in all five major statistical categories for a season: points, rebounds, assists, blocks, and steals. He accomplished the feat in the 1977–78 season, averaging 18.6 points, 14.0 rebounds, 4.6 assists, 0.9 blocks and 1.3 steals as Boston finished 32–50.

In 1996, Cowens was honored as one of the league's greatest players of all time by being named to the NBA 50th Anniversary Team. In October 2021, Cowens was again honored as one of the league's greatest players of all time by being named to the NBA 75th Anniversary Team. To commemorate the NBA's 75th Anniversary The Athletic ranked their top 75 players of all time, and named Cowens as the 57th greatest player in NBA history.

"No one ever did more for the Celtics than Dave did," said John Havlicek of his Celtic teammate.

Coaching career 

He began his coaching career by serving as a player-coach for the Boston Celtics during the 1978–79 season, but he quit coaching after the season and returned as a full-time player before retiring in 1980.

Cowens coached the Bay State Bombardiers of the Continental Basketball Association in 1984–85.

Cowens returned to the NBA coaching ranks as an assistant coach for the San Antonio Spurs in 1994–96 and was considered for the coaching job of the Boston Celtics during the 1995 offseason. He served as head coach of the Charlotte Hornets from 1996 to 1999 and was the head coach of the Golden State Warriors from 1999 to 2001, a tenure of 105 games.

In 2005–06 Cowens was head coach of the Chicago Sky of the Women's National Basketball Association (WNBA).

Cowens was an assistant coach of the Detroit Pistons from 2006 to 2009.

Politics
In 1990, Cowens, a former Democrat, ran as a Republican for Massachusetts Secretary of the Commonwealth. However, because he did not register by June 5, 1989, he was unable to appear on the primary ballot. Cowens considered running a sticker campaign for the Republican nomination, but decided to drop out of the race.

Personal life
Cowens married his wife, Deby, in 1978. They have two daughters and several grandchildren. In 1977, Cowens spent a day driving a taxi cab for the Independent Taxi Operators Association (ITOA) in Boston. "Nobody even knew who I was," Cowens told ESPN. "I put my cap on and just you know drove around. I got decent tips, though."

Honors
 In 1973, Cowens was inducted into the Florida Sports Hall of Fame.
 Cowens was inducted into the Florida State Athletics Hall of Fame in 1977.
 Cowens's #13 is an Honored number at Florida State University.
 On February 8, 1981, the Boston Celtics retired Cowens's #18 jersey.

 In 1991, Cowens was inducted into the Naismith Memorial Basketball Hall of Fame.
 Cowens was inducted into the College Basketball Hall of Fame in 2006.

NBA career statistics

Regular season 

|-
| style="text-align:left;"| 
| style="text-align:left;"|Boston
| 81 || – || 38.0 || .422 || – || .732 || 15.0 || 2.8 || – || – || 17.0
|-
| style="text-align:left;"| 
| style="text-align:left;"|Boston
| 79 || – || 40.3 || .484 || – || .720 || 15.2 || 3.1 || – || – || 18.8
|-
| style="text-align:left;"| 
| style="text-align:left;"|Boston
| style="background:#cfecec;"|82* || – || 41.8 || .452 || – || .779 || 16.2 || 4.1 || – || – || 20.5
|-
| style="text-align:left;background:#afe6ba;"|†
| style="text-align:left;"|Boston
| 80 || – || 41.9 || .437 || – || .832 || 15.7 || 4.4 || 1.2 || 1.3 || 19.0
|-
| style="text-align:left;"| 
| style="text-align:left;"|Boston
| 65 || – || 40.5 || .475 || – || .783 || 14.7 || 4.6 || 1.3 || 1.1 || 20.4
|-
| style="text-align:left;background:#afe6ba;"|†
| style="text-align:left;"|Boston
| 78 || – || 39.8 || .468 || – || .756 || 16.0 || 4.2 || 1.2 || 0.9 || 19.0
|-
| style="text-align:left;"| 
| style="text-align:left;"|Boston
| 50 || – || 37.8 || .434 || – || .818 || 13.9 || 5.0 || 0.9 || 1.0 || 16.4
|-
| style="text-align:left;"| 
| style="text-align:left;"|Boston
| 77 || – || 41.8 || .490 || – || .842 || 14.0 || 4.6 || 1.3 || 0.9 || 18.6
|-
| style="text-align:left;"| 
| style="text-align:left;"|Boston
| 68 || – || 37.0 || .483 || – || .807 || 9.6 || 3.6 || 1.1 || 0.8 || 16.6
|-
| style="text-align:left;"| 
| style="text-align:left;"|Boston
| 66 || 55 || 32.7 || .453 || .083 || .779 || 8.1 || 3.1 || 1.0 || 0.9 || 14.2
|-
| style="text-align:left;"| 
| style="text-align:left;"|Milwaukee
| 40 || 34 || 25.4 || .444 || .000 || .825 || 6.9 || 2.1 || 0.8 || 0.4 || 8.1
|- class="sortbottom"
| style="text-align:center;" colspan="2"| Career
| 766 || 89 || 38.6 || .460 || .071 || .783 || 13.6 || 3.8 || 1.1 || 0.9 || 17.6

|- class="sortbottom"
| style="text-align:center;" colspan="2"| All-Star
| 6 || 4 || 25.7 || .500 || – || .714 || 13.5 || 2.0 || 0.7 || 0.2 || 12.7

Playoffs 

|-
|style="text-align:left;"|1972
| style="text-align:left;"|Boston
|11||–||40.1||.455||–||.596||13.8||3.0||–||–||15.5
|-
|style="text-align:left;"|1973
| style="text-align:left;"|Boston
|13||–||46.0||.473||–||.659||16.6||3.7||–||–||21.9
|-
| style="text-align:left;background:#afe6ba;"|1974†
| style="text-align:left;"|Boston
|18||–||42.9||.435||–||.797||13.3||3.7||1.2||0.9||20.5
|-
|style="text-align:left;"|1975
| style="text-align:left;"|Boston
|11||–||43.5||.428||–||.885||16.5||4.2||1.6||0.5||20.5
|-
| style="text-align:left;background:#afe6ba;"|1976†
| style="text-align:left;"|Boston
|18||–||44.3||.457||–||.759||16.4||4.6||1.2||0.7||21.0
|-
|style="text-align:left;"|1977
| style="text-align:left;"|Boston
|9||–||42.1||.446||–||.773||14.9||4.0||0.9||1.4||16.6
|-
|style="text-align:left;"|1980
| style="text-align:left;"|Boston
|9||–||33.4||.476||.000||.909||7.3||2.3||1.0||0.8||12.0
|- class="sortbottom"
| style="text-align:center;" colspan="2"| Career
| 89 || – || 42.3 || .451 || .000 || .744 || 14.4 || 3.7 || 1.2 || 0.9 || 18.9

Head coaching record

NBA

|-
| style="text-align:left;"|Boston
| style="text-align:left;"|
|68||27||41|||| style="text-align:center;"|5th in Atlantic||-||-||-||
| style="text-align:center;"|Missed playoffs
|- 
| style="text-align:left;"|Charlotte
| style="text-align:left;"|
|82||54||28|||| style="text-align:center;"|4th in Central||3||0||3||
| style="text-align:center;"|Lost in First Round
|- 
| style="text-align:left;"|Charlotte
| style="text-align:left;"|
|82||51||31|||| style="text-align:center;"|3rd in Central||9||4||5||
| style="text-align:center;"|Lost in Conf. Semifinals
|- 
| style="text-align:left;"|Charlotte
| style="text-align:left;"|
|15||4||11|||| style="text-align:center;"|(resigned)||–||–||–||–
| style="text-align:center;"|–
|-
| style="text-align:left;"|Golden State
| style="text-align:left;"|
|82||17||65|||| style="text-align:center;"|7th in Pacific||–||–||–||–
| style="text-align:center;"|Missed playoffs
|-
| style="text-align:left;"|Golden State
| style="text-align:left;"|
|23||8||15|||| style="text-align:center;"|(fired)||–||–||–||–
| style="text-align:center;"|–
|- class="sortbottom"
| style="text-align:left;"|Career
| ||352||161||191|||| ||12||4||8||

WNBA

|-
| style="text-align:left;"|CHI
| style="text-align:left;"|
|34||5||29|||| style="text-align:center;"|7th in East||–||–||–||–
| style="text-align:center;"|Missed Playoffs
|- class="sortbottom"
| style="text-align:left;"|Career
| ||34||5||29|||| ||||||||

See also 
 List of National Basketball Association career rebounding leaders

References

Further reading

External links

 
 NBA History profile

1948 births
Living people
American men's basketball players
American women's basketball coaches
Basketball coaches from Kentucky
Basketball players from Kentucky
Boston Celtics draft picks
Boston Celtics head coaches
Boston Celtics players
Charlotte Hornets head coaches
Chicago Sky coaches
College basketball announcers in the United States
Continental Basketball Association coaches
Detroit Pistons assistant coaches
Golden State Warriors head coaches
Florida State Seminoles men's basketball players
Massachusetts Republicans
Milwaukee Bucks assistant coaches
Milwaukee Bucks players
Naismith Memorial Basketball Hall of Fame inductees
National Basketball Association All-Stars
National Basketball Association players with retired numbers
National Collegiate Basketball Hall of Fame inductees
Newport Central Catholic High School alumni
People from Newport, Kentucky
Player-coaches
Power forwards (basketball)
San Antonio Spurs assistant coaches
Sportspeople from the Cincinnati metropolitan area
Utah Stars draft picks
Women's National Basketball Association general managers